Ittehad-e-Tanzeemat-Madaris Pakistan is a federation of associations representing the madrassas (Islamic schools) of different schools of Islam in Pakistan. The five members are 1- Wifaq ul Madaris Al-Arabia, 2-Tanzeem ul Madaris Ahle Sunnat, 3-Wafaq Ul Madaris Al Salafia, 4-Rabta-ul-Madaris and 5-Wifaq Ul Madaris Al-Shia.

Presidents
 Abdur Razzaq Iskander (2017 - 2021)
 Muhammad Taqi Usmani (2021–present)

See also
 Madrassas in Pakistan

References

Islamic organisations based in Pakistan
Education in Pakistan
Madrasas in Pakistan